Brigadier Geoffrey Souter Cox,  (4 December 1914 – 16 November 1964) was an Australian soldier and politician. A decorated officer during the Second World War, he later entered politics, serving as a Liberal Party member of the New South Wales Legislative Assembly from 1957 to 1964, representing the electorate of Vaucluse.

Cox was born in Bondi, and educated at Cleveland Street High School and Sydney Grammar School. He worked as an insurance clerk before the Second World War, but was active in the Citizens Military Force from 1936. Rising to the rank of sergeant by 1939, Cox was commissioned as a lieutenant later that year and enlisted in the Second Australian Imperial Force for active service in the Second World War. He was a platoon commander in the Middle East and Greece in the early stages of the war, where he met his later wife, whom he married during a brief return to Australia in 1942. He was subsequently deployed to New Guinea, where he was awarded the Military Cross for his courage. Cox was later promoted to major and lieutenant colonel, and was awarded the Distinguished Service Order for his role in administering two successful operations in 1945, during the closing stages of the war. Cox returned to Bondi after the war, working as a real-estate agent in the family business, and remaining active in the Citizens Military Force, where he rose to the rank of brigadier.

Cox was elected to the Legislative Assembly for the state seat of Vaucluse at a 1957 by-election following the retirement of Liberal leader Murray Robson. He served on the Liberal executive from 1963 to 1964, but did not hold parliamentary or ministerial office. Cox committed suicide in his office at Parliament House on 16 November 1964, and was buried in a churchyard at Rose Bay.

References

 

1914 births
1964 deaths
Military personnel from New South Wales
20th-century Australian politicians
Australian brigadiers
Australian Companions of the Distinguished Service Order
Australian Army personnel of World War II
Australian military personnel who committed suicide
Australian politicians who committed suicide
Liberal Party of Australia members of the Parliament of New South Wales
Members of the New South Wales Legislative Assembly
People educated at Sydney Grammar School
Politicians from Sydney
Recipients of the Military Cross
Suicides in New South Wales
Suicides by firearm in Australia